MPP Jedinstvo (full name: Montažno proizvodno preduzeće Jedinstvo) is a Serbian construction company headquartered in Sevojno, Užice, Serbia.

History
MPP Jedinstvo was founded in 1947 in Sevojno, SFR Yugoslavia.

After its privatization and transformation into a joint-stock company, Jedinstvo Sevojno was admitted to the free market of the Belgrade Stock Exchange on October 27, 2004.

Activities 
The Jedinstvo Sevojno company builds thermal and hydraulic power plants, as well as thermal or hydraulic systems. It also operates through six subsidiaries, including Jedinstvo Metalogradnja a.d., founded in 1947, which builds various metal structures designed and made to order, Užice-gas a.d., established in 2007, and Zlatibor-gas d.o.o., established in 2008, which builds gas pipelines and distributes natural gas.

Autokuća Raketa a.d. specializes in the sale of vehicles at regional level of automobiles of the Peugeot, Fiat, Zastava, Zastava kamioni and Lada brands as well as in services around the automobile, in particular cleaning and maintenance of vehicles.

Market and financial data
As of 8 March 2019, MPP Jedinstvo has a market capitalization of 11.77 million euros.

Subsidiaries
This is a list of companies that operate as subsidiarys of MPP Jedinstvo:
 MPP Jedinstvo Metalogradnja a.d.
 Auto Kuća Raketa a.d.
 Užice Gas a.d.
 Zlatibor Gas d.o.o.
 Metaling Eko d.o.o.
 Jedinstvo Livnica Požega d.o.o.
 Novi Put Plus d.o.o.
 Novi Pazar Put a.d.
 Tehnogrupa ABG d.o.o.
 MPP Jedinstvo d.o.o. Montenegro
 Jedinstvo Inženjering o.o.o. Russia
 MPP Jedinstvo d.o.o. Slovenia
 Feniks ICC d.o.o. Slovenia
 MPP Jedinstvo d.o.o. Kosovo
 MPP Jedinstvo BH d.o.o. Bosnia and Herzegovina

References

External links
 

1947 establishments in Serbia
Companies based in Užice
Construction and civil engineering companies established in 1947
Construction and civil engineering companies of Serbia